Linden Hills is a neighborhood in the Southwest community of Minneapolis on a hill overlooking Lake Harriet. It was one of the last areas to be developed in the City of Minneapolis. A majority of the land around where neighborhood is today was cottages and open land until the 1870s. The area started growing following the extension of the Como-Harriet Streetcar Line through the neighborhood. It gained a reputation as popular destination area for the young and wealthy of Minneapolis to get away from the city.

It is bordered to the north by Bde Maka Ska and West 36th Street, to the east by Lake Harriet and William Berry Parkway, to the south by West 47th Street, and to the west by France Avenue.

According to the 2000 U.S. Census, there were 7,370 people in the neighborhood, of whom 94% were white, 1% were black, 0.5% were Native American, 2% were Asian American/Pacific Islander, and 2.5% were other/two or more races.

The Lake Harriet Bandshell is located on the lakeshore on the eastern edge of the neighborhood. The current bandshell, constructed in 1985, is a fifth-generation music venue on the lake. The first two were destroyed by fire, the third was destroyed by a wind storm, and the fourth was demolished in 1985. The main platform and carbarn of the Como-Harriet Streetcar Line are also located in the neighborhood, near West 42nd Street and Queen Avenue.

The neighborhood's commercial corridor, centering on Upton Avenue and 43rd Street, was constructed along the Como-Harriet streetcar line in the 1920s, and is today home to many shops and dining establishments, including one of the first Great Harvest franchises, Heartfelt Craft Studio, Sebastian Joe's Ice Cream Café, Wild Rumpus Bookstore, New Gild Jewelers, the Zumbro Café, Naviya's Thai Bistro, Harriet Brasserie, Coffee & Tea Ltd, Dunn Brothers Coffee and Tilia.  It was the home of the second location of what became the Famous Dave's restaurant chain in 1995 and was designed like an old-fashioned BBQ shack; it was closed in 2014 after the property was sold for redevelopment into a denser mixed-use project of condominiums and retail.

The Linden Hills area was featured in a scene of the 1996 film Jingle All The Way.

Southwest High School is located at the southern edge of the neighborhood on West 47th Street between Abbott and Chowen Avenues.

References

External links 
 Minneapolis Neighborhood Profile – Linden Hills
 Linden Hills Neighborhood Council
 Linden Hills Business Association
Businesses in Linden Hills
 Southwest Minneapolis Business Directory (NEHBA sponsored) 
 Linden Hills History Study Group
 Neighborhood photos

Neighborhoods in Minneapolis
Streetcar suburbs